Joanna Cohen is an American television soap opera writer. She started working in 2006.

Positions held
All My Children
Script Writer: July 28, 2006 - December 19, 2007; March 21, 2008 – September 23, 2011; June 26, 2013 - fall 2013.
General Hospital
Occasional Script Writer: January 19, 2012 – February 3, 2012
The Young and the Restless
Writer: fall 2013 – present

External links

American soap opera writers
Year of birth missing (living people)
Living people
American women television writers
21st-century American women